Kurt Weidner was a German luger who competed in the mid-1930s. He won two medals in the men's doubles event at the European luge championships with a gold in 1937 and a silver in 1935.

References

German male lugers
Year of birth missing
Year of death missing